The Western Libyan Gas Project (WLGP) is a 50–50 joint venture between the Libyan National Oil Corporation (NOC) and the Italian company Eni which came online in October 2004. From Sicily, the natural gas travels to the Italian mainland, and then onwards to the rest of Europe. WLGP is the first major project to valorize the natural gas produced in Libya through export to and marketing in Europe. WLGP is supplied from production at the Bahr Essalam and Wafa fields, which is processed at the onshore Mellitah treatment plant.

Notes

References

Energy Information Administration (2007) Libya: Country Analysis Brief
World Bank (2006), Libyan Arab Jamahiriya: Economic Report, Social & Economic Development Group: MENA Region
P. Mobbs (2002) Mineral Industry of Libya
Thomas S. Ahlbrandt (2001) Sirte Basin Province: Sirte-Zelten Total Petroleum System U.S. Geological Survey

Oil and gas companies of Libya
Tripolitania
Italy–Libya relations
Natural gas in Libya
Eni